The Staircase Murders is a 2007 Lifetime television film directed by Tom McLoughlin and starring Treat Williams, Samaire Armstrong, and Kevin Pollak.

It tells the story of Michael Peterson, who was convicted in 2003 of killing his wife by beating her over the head. During the trial it was revealed that many years previously a friend of Peterson's, whose children he would later adopt, died under seemingly similar circumstances.

References

External links
 

Lifetime (TV network) films
American films based on actual events
2007 television films
2007 films
Films directed by Tom McLoughlin
American courtroom films
Films about murder
2000s English-language films
2000s American films